Mellisuga is a genus of hummingbirds in the family Trochilidae. They are notable for being the first and second smallest bird species in the world.

The genus was introduced by the French zoologist Mathurin Jacques Brisson in 1760 with the vervain hummingbird as the type species. The name Mellisuga is a combination of the Latin words mel or mellis, meaning "honey" and sugere, meaning "to suck".

Extant species
The genus contains two species:

References

 
Taxonomy articles created by Polbot
Higher-level bird taxa restricted to the West Indies